Kamieńczyk may refer to the following places in Poland:
Kamieńczyk, Lower Silesian Voivodeship (south-west Poland)
Kamieńczyk, Kuyavian-Pomeranian Voivodeship (north-central Poland)
Kamieńczyk, Sokołów County in Masovian Voivodeship (east-central Poland)
Kamieńczyk, Wyszków County in Masovian Voivodeship (east-central Poland)
Kamieńczyk, Warmian-Masurian Voivodeship (north Poland)